Grandtully Castle is an historic building in Grandtully, Perth and Kinross, Scotland. It is a Category A listed building dating to 1560.

The current castle consists of a Z-plan three-storey towerhouse of 1560, extended in 1626 to create a fortified house. In the calmer world of the 19th century, extensive additions were made in the 1890s in the Scots Baronial style by Leadbetter & Fairley.

The lands and castle belonged to the Stewart family from the 14th century, Thomas Stewart of Grandtully being mentioned in 1587. The castle was used by the Earl of Mar in the Jacobite Rising of 1715 and by Bonnie Prince Charlie in the 1745 rebellion.

In the early 1860s, the estate was rented by Duleep Singh, the last Maharaja of the Sikh Empire, known as the Black Prince of Perthshire. He had previously lived at nearby Castle Menzies.

The property was modernised internally in the 1920s. It is now divided as private flats.

It is said to be the basis of "Tully-Veolan" in Sir Walter Scott's "Waverley" novels.

See also
List of Category A listed buildings in Perth and Kinross

References

Category A listed buildings in Perth and Kinross
1560 establishments in Scotland
Castles in Perth and Kinross
Houses in Perth and Kinross
Listed castles in Scotland